Palisades Charter High School  (usually colloquially known as Pali or Pali High and abbreviated as PCHS) is an independent charter secondary school in Los Angeles, United States. The high school serves the neighborhoods of Pacific Palisades, Palisades Highlands, Kenter Canyon, and portions of Brentwood (including Brentwood Circle). Residents in Topanga, an unincorporated section of Los Angeles County, may attend Palisades or William Howard Taft Charter High School.

The school serves grades 9 through 12. Formerly directly administered by the Los Angeles Unified School District, the school is now an independent charter school. Its current enrollment numbers 2,903 students.  Many students travel long distances to attend Palisades Charter High, which is one of the most highly ranked public high schools in the Los Angeles area.

In 2005, Palisades was recognized as a California Distinguished School. In 2015, Palisades was named one of America's Best High Schools by Newsweek and U.S. News & World Report.

Paul Revere Charter Middle School students are allowed to attend as a feeder school.

History

The school was founded in 1961. It was built for $6 million on a filled-in canyon. At the time it was the most expensive high school in the LA City Schools. The founding principal was Herbert L. Aigner (died in 2000). The Class of 2012 was the 50th graduating class. 

Prior to the founding, the property was called All Hallows Farm and for many years was owned by the Conway family: Hollywood film director Jack Conway; his wife, actress Virginia Conway — daughter of silent screen star Francis X. Bushman — and their two sons, one of whom, Pat Conway became an actor as well. This property was subsequently rented to actress Debbie Reynolds and her husband, singer Eddie Fisher. It was then taken, some years later, by the State by eminent domain to build the high school.

Several members of the class of 1965 were profiled in a Time magazine article, which led to a best-selling 1976 book by class members David Wallechinsky and Michael Medved, What Really Happened to the Class of '65?. The book featured interviews with several members of the class, whose experiences were recounted both individually and in groupings around shared themes such as the Vietnam War and the draft, drug experimentation, and sex. Various teachers from the school also were interviewed, among them French teacher Mr. Fred Johnson, and English teachers Miss Jean O'Brien and Mrs. Rose "Mama G" Gilbert, who retired during 2012-2013 after 63 years of teaching. At age 94, Mrs. Gilbert was the oldest active teacher in the LAUSD. The Star Wars character of Maz Kanata was based on her. The success of the book later inspired a short-lived television dramatic anthology series of the same title, which ran from December 1977 to July 1978 on NBC.

In 1989 20/20 aired an episode about the students of Palisades High School. Howard Rosenberg of the Los Angeles Times wrote that "Palisades High School is characterized here as both an institution of high academic performance and high drug and alcohol use. What 20/20 doesn't ask tonight is how both are possible at the same school."

Circa 1992 there were so few students that LAUSD was considering closing the school. Pali High parents, principal Merle Price, and Pali High staff decided to advocate for making the school into a charter school. In 1993 the school, along with three feeder elementary schools, received approval from the Los Angeles Board of Education to become a charter school. This was the first time a group of schools in California became charter schools. The school asked students to abide by a behavior code and instituted new academic programs. By 1998 student enrollment recovered: it had 200 students previously attending private schools.

This school was the focus of a false email chain letter started around 2002. The message falsely claimed that a satiric message to parents about student truancies and homework problems was actually on the school's answering machine. The message was originally written in response to parent outrage that students who skipped class more than ten days per 90-schoolday semester (not counting legitimate absences, like sickness) could receive a failing grade in that class. This was reported on several web sites, including Snopes, and BreakTheChain.org.

Campus

The campus is bounded by Temescal Canyon Road to the east, Sunset Boulevard to the north, El Medio Street to the west, and Temescal Academy (formerly known as first Temescal Canyon Continuation School and later Temescal High School) to the south. It is bisected by Bowdoin Street, which runs between the school's football field and the academic center of the school. Located only a mile from Will Rogers State Beach, the football stadium is called "Stadium by the Sea."

Many movies have been filmed at Palisades. One of the first major motion pictures to be shot at Pali High was Carrie.  Directors George Lucas and Brian De Palma held a joint audition for Carrie and Lucas's Star Wars (1977) on the Palisades campus. Other movies filmed on site include The Swinging Cheerleaders (1974), Popular (1999), Crazy/Beautiful (2001), The Glass House (2001), Old School (2003), Freaky Friday (2003), Havoc (2005), and Project X (2012). The TV series Modern Family (2013), Teen Wolf (2011),  the Netflix series American Vandal (2017), Dude (2017), and He's All That (2021) were also filmed at the school.

Pali High was also used for the Sweet Valley High book, Party Weekend.

On April 25, 2021, the music video for Olivia Rodrigo's song "Good 4 U" was filmed at Palisades, directed by Petra Collins. The song later debuted at #1 on the Billboard Hot 100.

As of 2010, approximately 43% of the student body, 1,180 out of 2,742 students, were bused to Palisades Charter High School from more than 100 Los Angeles zip codes. In 1994, approximately 70% of the student body, 1,176 out of 1,680 students, were bused from South-Central and East Los Angeles.

Demographics

According to U.S. News & World Report, 49% of Palisades Charter's student body is "of color," with 32% of the student body coming from an economically disadvantaged household, determined by student eligibility for California's Reduced-price meal program.

Curriculum 

 most of its classes are university preparatory in nature, and it hosts a mathematics, science, and technology magnet program. The school also has humanities and marine biology courses.

The school includes a New Media Academy that was, as of 1998, one of three in LAUSD. Pali High uses its charter school status to increase the visibility of this program. By that year DreamWorks had financed it with $100,000. The location fees generated by Aaron Spelling use of the school for Malibu Shores were used to, by 1998, install a new computer lab.

As of 2002 Palisades High School offers a surfing class that can be taken for physical education credit. It was established around 1998 by Ray Millette, a marine biology teacher and surfer.

Palisades Charter High School is known for having a great music program. Its marching band has medaled 3 years in a row at the SCSBOA championships: in 2013 getting silver, in 2014 winning the gold for 3A and in 2015 getting bronze. The school also has a winter Drumline that competes in both SCPA and WGI and is also the 2016 SCPA "A class" silver medalist.

Discrimination and lawsuits

In 2016, extensive hate graffiti was found at the campus including references to the Ku Klux Klan, Jews, African-Americans, and LGBTQ people.

In June 2017, Palisades Charter High School gained national media attention after an African-American student was depicted in a student blog with a noose drawn around her neck.

In December 2021, following a false school shooting threat targeting Pali as well as other schools in the area, extensive graffiti was discovered on the campus. Among other things, messages proclaiming "Black Lives Matter" and "Kill the Dean" were spray-painted, along an Anarchy symbol and symbols of other extremist political movements.

Notable alumni

J. J. Abrams '84 – director, screenwriter, and television show creator
Alex Alben '76 – author, columnist, internet executive
Amy Alcott '75 – Hall of Fame golfer
Scott Alexander – screenwriter
David Baerwald '78 – composer, songwriter, musician, producer
A. Scott Berg '67 – Pulitzer Prize-winning biographer
Jeanie Buss '79 – president and co-owner of Los Angeles Lakers, serves on NBA's board of governors
Stephen M. Daniels '64 – attorney, Chair of the Civilian Board of Contract Appeals
Brian Dailey '69 – artist and international security 
Peter DeLuise – actor
 Dane Elkins (born 1999) – professional racquetball player
Chip Engelland – '79 - Duke University basketball player, NBA coach
Roy Fegan '79 – actor, Hollywood Shuffle and The Five Heartbeats
Chris Ferguson – poker player
Michael Freedman '69 – Fields Medal in mathematics
Richard Gelinas '65 – Nobel Prize biologist (Medicine 1993) 
Max Graham '87 – record producer and DJ
Alex Greenwald – actor and musician
Rusty Hamer '64 – actor
Susanna Hoffs '76 – member of The Bangles
Willa Holland – actress
David Holt winter '64 – musician with multiple Grammy Awards for bluegrass and traditional music
Raffi Hovannisian, '77 – first Foreign Minister of independent Armenia
Nick Itkin '17 - Olympic fencer, junior world champion
Elizabeth Keifer '79 – actress
Steve Kerr '83 – five-time NBA champion as a player, three-time NBA champion as a coach of Golden State Warriors
 Perry Klein (born 1971) – American football quarterback in the National Football League for the Atlanta Falcons
Jennifer Jason Leigh – Oscar-nominated actress and director
Ahmad Ali Lewis – hip-hop artist, member of 4th Avenue Jones
Daniel S. Loeb – hedge fund manager
Lauren London - actress
Ricci Luyties- professional indoor volleyball and beach volleyball player, head coach of UC San Diego Tritons women's team
Jeff Madsen – poker player, former youngest winner of World Series of Poker bracelet
Ron Mael and Russell Mael – musicians (the band Sparks)
Michael Medved '65 – film critic, radio host, commentator
Penelope Ann Miller '81 – Tony Award and Golden Globe-nominated actress
Jon Moscot '09 – American-Israeli major league baseball pitcher (Cincinnati Reds)
Deroy Murdock '82 – syndicated columnist, political commentator
Matthew Nelson and Gunnar Nelson – musicians, formerly of chart-topping early '90s band Nelson
David Newman – film score composer '71
Thomas Newman '73 – film score composer
Eddy Oh - musician, member of JJCC
Philip Price '78 – musician, lead singer of the band Winterpills
Redfoo (Stefan Kendal Gordy) - musician, member of LMFAO
David Roback – musician, Rain Parade, Opal, Mazzy Star.
Stephen Rosenbaum '83 – two-time Academy Award-winning visual effects supervisor
Antonio Sabàto Jr. (born 1972) – Italian-American model, actor, and aspiring politician 
Jean Sagal and Liz Sagal – former Doublemint Twins and sisters of Katey Sagal
Katey Sagal – Married with Children and Sons of Anarchy actress
Michael Sandel '71 – professor at Harvard
Kim Schrier '86 - US Congressional Representative of Washington's 8th congressional district
Jay Schroeder '79 – former NFL quarterback – Washington Redskins, Los Angeles Raiders, Cincinnati Bengals, Arizona Cardinals
Geoff Schwartz – former NFL offensive lineman – Carolina Panthers, Minnesota Vikings, Kansas City Chiefs, New York Giants
Mitchell Schwartz – 3-time all-pro NFL offensive lineman – Cleveland Browns, Kansas City Chiefs
Adam Shankman '82 – director and choreographer
Stephen Silberkraus – Nevada State Assemblyman, District 29
Tony Sills – PGA Tour golfer
Amy Smart '94 – actress
Alan Smolinisky – entrepreneur, real estate investor, owner of the Los Angeles Dodgers
Kent Steffes – Olympic gold medalist, beach volleyball (1996), professional beach volleyball player
Randy Stoklos '78 - professional beach volleyball player
Ted Stryker '89 – KROQ-FM DJ
Syd – DJ producer and singer
Hallie Todd '79 – actress (maiden name: Hallie Eckstein)
Michael Trope '69 – trial lawyer, co-founder of Trope and Decarolis; previous sports agent
Kiki Vandeweghe '76 – UCLA and NBA forward, general manager of Denver Nuggets
David Wallechinsky '65 – author and essayist
Chris Watts '82 – visual effects supervisor
Forest Whitaker '79 – Academy Award-winning actor
will.i.am (William James Adams Jr.) ‘93 – musician, member of The Black Eyed Peas
Gregg Zuckerman '66 – mathematician at Yale and the Institute for Advanced Study
J. D. Daniels – The Mighty Ducks & Going Places  former child actor

Sending schools
As some LAUSD zoned high schools do not have enough space to educate all residents in their attendance boundaries, some schools send excess students to Palisades.

They were, as of spring 2007:

 Belmont
 Crenshaw
 Dorsey
 Fairfax
 Fremont
 Hamilton
 Hollywood
 Jefferson
 Los Angeles
 Manual Arts
 Santee Education Complex
 Van Nuys
 Washington Preparatory

References

Additional references
SportsLine.com on Geoff McArthur  Retrieved August 6, 2005.
collegesports.com Player Bio: David Koral :: Football Retrieved August 6, 2005.
CLASS Speaker:  Jay Schroeder  Retrieved August 6, 2005.

External links

A History of Pali High...
Mrs. Gilbert's still working at Pali--"Go Mama G!" from the Palisades Post
 Official Palisades Charter Lacrosse Team website

High schools in Los Angeles
Los Angeles Unified School District schools
Charter high schools in California
Pacific Palisades, Los Angeles
Sunset Boulevard (Los Angeles)
Educational institutions established in 1961
1961 establishments in California